Marc-Antoine Dequoy (born September 15, 1994) is a professional gridiron football defensive back for the Montreal Alouettes of the Canadian Football League (CFL). He played U Sports football for the Montreal Carabins.

Early life and high school
Dequoy grew up in Montreal on Île-Bizard and began playing organized football at the age of five. He played many positions in youth clubs but mainly safety. He attended Cégep André-Laurendeau in 2012 but did not play football, citing a lack of passion. The following year, he transferred to Montmorency College and played five games after trying out for the team. He did not play in 2014 due to a broken left collarbone. In 2015, Dequoy also did not play due to being ruled ineligibile.

University career
Dequoy enrolled at the University of Montreal and moved up the depth chart on the Carabins football team in 2016. He mainly played on special teams and had 9.5 tackles while appearing in five games. In 2017, Dequoy was a Quebec conference (RSEQ) all-star and a second-team all-star in U Sports after contributing 29.5 tackles and three interceptions in addition to one tackle for loss and four pass breakups in seven games. He was named RSEQ defensive player of the year in 2018. Dequoy was a USports first-team all-Canadian in 2019 after leading the team with 37.5 tackles and three interceptions in eight games. He returned an interception 85 yards for a touchdown versus Laval in the Dunsmore Cup. During the 55th Vanier Cup championship loss against Calgary in November 2019, he suffered a broken right forearm during a tackle. Dequoy was invited to the East–West Shrine Bowl but could not participate due to the injury. During his pro day, Dequoy ran a 4.35-second time in the 40-yard dash, the second-fastest for cornerbacks behind Javelin Guidry, despite suffering from the flu.

Professional career

Green Bay Packers
After going undrafted in the 2020 NFL draft, Dequoy was signed by the Green Bay Packers on April 26, 2020. He became the first Montreal player to sign with an NFL team on draft weekend and second overall, after David Foucault in 2014. Dequoy was waived by the Packers on August 15, 2020.

Montreal Alouettes
Dequoy was selected 14th overall by the Montreal Alouettes in the 2020 CFL draft. He signed with the Alouettes on January 4, 2021. He played in his first professional game on August 14, 2021 against the Edmonton Elks. He played in eight regular games during the 2021 season where he had one defensive tackle and eight special teams tackles.

On June 23, 2022, Dequoy scored his first career professional touchdown on a 21-yard interception return on an errant Cody Fajardo pass in a game against the Saskatchewan Roughriders. He played and started in 17 regular season games, sitting out one due to injury, where he had 38 defensive tackles, four special teams tackles, four interceptions, one forced fumble, and one touchdown.

References

External links
Montreal Alouettes bio
Montreal Carabins bio

1994 births
Living people
Canadian players of American football
Canadian football people from Montreal
American football cornerbacks
Montreal Carabins football players
Green Bay Packers players
Montreal Alouettes players
Big Brother Canada contestants